Gánovce is a village in the Poprad District of the Prešov Region in northern Slovakia, situated 3 km south-east from the town of Poprad.

History
Gánovce was mentioned for the first time in written records in 1317 as "villa Ganau". However, the church in Gánovce is older, dated to the 13th century and the settlement called Filice (originally a separate village, but united with Gánovce in 1924) was already mentioned in 1236. Gánovce was inhabited by the Spiš spearmen, who enjoyed a higher social and legal status than ordinary peasants from the neighboring villages. Historical names of the village are Ganowcze, Gansdorf and Ganóc.  The village was best known for its healing hot springs, already mentioned in 1549, and a spa existed there until 1992.

Landmarks
The church, built in the early-Gothic style (13th century) features Gothic frescoes from the 14th century, a Gothic wooden altar (from 1500), a Baroque altar, and two ancient bells (14th and 18th century).

The travertine rocks near the village are an important archaeological site, in which a skull of a neanderthal man and remnants of prehistoric animals have been found. The neanderthal skull is a casting of brain cavity, dating from 100,000 years ago and was found in 1926. The original is now deposited at the Czech National Museum in Prague and a copy is found in the Slovak National Museum at the Bratislava Castle. An exhibition dedicated to the "Man of Gánovce" also known as Ganovsky Man is in a museum in Poprad.

See also
 List of municipalities and towns in Slovakia

References

Genealogical resources

The records for genealogical research are available at the state archive "Statny Archiv in Levoca, Slovakia"

 Roman Catholic church records (births/marriages/deaths): 1731-1896 (parish B)
 Lutheran church records (births/marriages/deaths): 1710-1910 (parish B)

External links
 Municipal website 
Surnames of living people in Ganovce

Villages and municipalities in Poprad District
Archaeological sites in Slovakia
Spiš
Neanderthal sites